Cemalettin Basaran (born April 20, 1960) is a Turkish-born American engineer who is currently a professor in the department of civil, structural and environmental engineering at the University at Buffalo, State University of New York.

Research 
Basaran's research is in the field of theoretical and applied mechanics, concentrating on failure mechanics of electronic packaging materials, 2-dimensional nano materials, and particle-filled composite materials under electrical, thermal and mechanical loads. Basaran was coinventor of the electrostatic doping-based all-graphene nano ribbon runnel field effect transistor, US patent number 10,593,7782.

Honors and awards 
Basaran in 2011 received the American Society of Mechanical Engineers Electronic & Photonic Packaging Division Excellence in Mechanics Award. In 2008 Basaran was elected to be a fellow of that same society. Basaram is the recipient of the US Navy Office of Naval Research Young Investigator Award, 1997 and Riefler Award, from the University at Buffalo, School of Engineering and Applied Sciences in 1997.

References

External links 

1960 births
Living people
University at Buffalo faculty
Engineering academics
American civil engineers
20th-century American engineers
21st-century American engineers
Yıldız Technical University alumni
Middle East Technical University alumni